Human infectious diseases may be characterized by their case fatality rate (CFR), the proportion of people diagnosed with a disease who die from it (cf. mortality rate). It should not be confused with the infection fatality rate (IFR), the estimated proportion of people infected by a disease-causing agent, including asymptomatic and undiagnosed infections, who die from the disease. IFR cannot be higher than the CFR and is often much lower, but is also much harder to calculate. Data are based on optimally treated patients and exclude isolated cases or minor outbreaks, unless otherwise indicated.

See also 
 Lists of diseases
 List of infectious diseases
 List of causes of death by rate
 List of notifiable diseases – diseases that should be reported to public health officials.

References 

Death-related lists
Epidemiology
Lists of diseases
Rates